In population genetics, the Watterson estimator is a method for describing the genetic diversity in a population. It was developed by Margaret Wu and G. A. Watterson in the 1970s. It is estimated by counting the number of polymorphic sites. It is a measure of the "population mutation rate" (the product of the effective population size and the neutral mutation rate) from the observed nucleotide diversity of a population. The assumptions made are that there is a sample of  haploid individuals from the population of interest, that there are infinitely many sites capable of varying (so that mutations never overlay or reverse one another), and that .
Because the number of segregating sites counted will increase with the number of sequences looked at, the correction factor  is used.

 

where  is the number of segregating sites (an example of a segregating site would be a single-nucleotide polymorphism) in the sample and

 

is the th harmonic number.

This estimate is based on coalescent theory. Watterson's estimator is commonly used for its simplicity. When its assumptions are met, the estimator is unbiased and the variance of the estimator decreases with increasing sample size or recombination rate. However, the estimator can be biased by population structure. For example,  is downwardly biased in an exponentially growing population.  It can also be biased by violation of the infinite-sites mutational model; if multiple mutations can overwrite one another, Watterson's estimator will be biased downward.

Comparing the value of the Watterson's estimator, to nucleotide diversity is the basis of Tajima's D which allows inference of the evolutionary regime of a given locus.

See also 

 Tajima's D
 Coupon collector's problem
 Ewens sampling formula

References

 
 McVean, Gil;  Awadalla, Philip; Fearnhead, Paul (2002) "A Coalescent-Based Method for Detecting and Estimating Recombination From Gene Sequences", Genetics, 160, 1231–1241.

Population genetics
Statistical genetics